Yangqiao may refer to the following towns in China: 

 Yangqiao, Boluo County (杨侨镇), Guangdong
 Yangqiao, Binyang County (洋桥镇), Guangxi
Written as "杨桥镇":
 Yangqiao, Anqing, in Yixiu District, Anqing, Anhui
 Yangqiao, Linquan County, Anhui
 Yangqiao, Daming County, Hebei
 Yangqiao, Hengdong (杨桥镇), a town of Hengdong County, Hunan.
 Yangqiao, Shaodong, in Shaodong County, Hunan
 Yangqiao, Fenyi County, in Fenyi County, Jiangxi